Lily Cowles (born September 7, 1987) is an  American actress known for her role as Isobel Evans in Roswell, New Mexico and Helen Park in Call of Duty: Black Ops Cold War.

Early life and education 
Cowles was born in 1987 and raised in rural Connecticut, the daughter of actress Christine Baranski and playwright Matthew Cowles. Cowles has an older sister, an attorney named Isabel. Cowles earned a Bachelor of Arts degree in religious studies from Princeton University. Cowles' father died of congestive heart failure in 2014.

Career 
After graduating from Princeton University, Cowles relocated to Los Angeles. She began her career in entertainment as a personal assistant to Jonah Hill during the production of True Story. In 2016, Cowles also had a reoccurring role in the political satire, BrainDead. Cowles was later cast in the CW reboot of Roswell, titled Roswell, New Mexico. 2020 saw Cowles play the role of Helen Park in the first-person shooter video game Call of Duty: Black Ops Cold War.

Filmography

References

External links

Living people
1987 births
American film actresses
American television actresses
Actresses from Connecticut
Princeton University alumni
21st-century American actresses